Shingaki is a Japanese surname. Notable people with the surname include:

 , Japanese wrestler
 , Japanese boxer
 , Japanese voice actor